Birdsey DeWight Minkler (October 9, 1849 – May 18, 1911) was an American politician in the state of Washington. He served in the Washington House of Representatives from 1889 to 1891.

He is the namesake of the community of Minkler, Washington.

References

Members of the Washington House of Representatives
1849 births
1911 deaths
19th-century American politicians
People from Omro, Wisconsin